Bistrica ob Dravi is a settlement on the right bank of the Drava River in the Municipality of Ruše in northeastern Slovenia. The area is part of the traditional region of Styria. The municipality is now included in the Drava Statistical Region.

History
Bistrica ob Dravi was created as a settlement when the former settlements of Bistrica pri Limbušu and Bistrica pri Rušah ( or ) were merged in 1992.

Cultural heritage
The village chapel-shrine dates to the late 19th century.

References

External links
Bistrica ob Dravi at Geopedia

Populated places in the Municipality of Ruše